Alfie Charles Jones (born 7 October 1997) is an English professional footballer who plays as a defender or midfielder for Hull City.

Career

Jones grew up in Long Ashton, a small village on the outskirts of Bristol. He attended  Backwell School and played at the Southampton Academy in Bath. 

Jones played on loan for Scottish Premiership club St Mirren during the 2018–19 season, but the agreement was terminated by St Mirren in January 2019.

On 2 July 2019, Jones signed a season-long loan with Gillingham. During his spell with the club, he made 36 appearances in all competitions.

On 4 September 2020, Jones joined League One side Hull City for an undisclosed fee, signing a one-year deal. He made his debut for the club on 8 September 2020, in the 
1–2 loss to Leicester City U21 in the first round match of the EFL Trophy.
On 18 May 2021, the club announced that they had exercised the option of a one-year contract extension for Jones.  On 9 June 2021, Hull City announced that Jones had signed a new two-year contract, with the club having the option of a further year.

Style of play
Having been used mostly as a defender prior to his arrival at Gillingham, Jones spent most of his time with the League One club playing as a midfielder.

Career statistics

Honours 
Hull City

 EFL League One Champions: 2020–21

References

External links

Southampton FC profile

1997 births
Living people
Footballers from Bristol
Association football defenders
Southampton F.C. players
St Mirren F.C. players
Gillingham F.C. players
English footballers
Hull City A.F.C. players
Scottish Professional Football League players
English Football League players